Just Dance 2021 is a 2020 dance rhythm game developed and published by Ubisoft. It was unveiled on August 26, 2020 during the Nintendo Direct Mini: Partner Showcase August 2020 web presentation as the twelfth main installment of the series, and was released on November 12, 2020, for Nintendo Switch, PlayStation 4, Xbox One, and Stadia, and on November 24, 2020, for PlayStation 5 and Xbox Series X/S. It is the first game in the series since the initial title not to be announced at E3, due to the event's cancellation in 2020 as a result of the COVID-19 pandemic. It is also the first game in the main series not to be released for the Wii and the first game in the series not to be available on a Nintendo optical disc.

Gameplay

As with the previous installments of the franchise, players must mimic the on-screen dancer's choreography to a chosen song using either motion controllers (excluding the ninth generation consoles and Stadia) or the game's associated smartphone app. The Stadia version also allows the use of a gamepad and a keyboard for menu navigation.

Its user interface and features are largely identical to Just Dance 2019 and Just Dance 2020. Changes include the "World Dance Floor" now being revamped with a three-song competitive tournament in rooms that matches a player's level with other players of a similar level, and a new results screen that details the player's accuracy rate in performing the moves. The game also features a new mode, known as "Quick Play" mode, in which the game randomly shuffles a song to make it easy for players to jump right into dancing without the struggle of choosing a song to dance to.

Soundtrack
The following songs appear on Just Dance 2021:

Kids Mode
The following songs appear on the Kids Mode of the game:

Just Dance Unlimited
Just Dance Unlimited continues to be offered on 2021 for eighth-generation consoles and Stadia, featuring a streaming library of new and existing songs. The service also made its debut on ninth-generation consoles with the release of 2021.

Songs exclusive to Just Dance Unlimited include:

References

External links

Dance video games
2020 video games
Fitness games
Just Dance (video game series)
Music video games
Kinect games
PlayStation 4 games
PlayStation 5 games
PlayStation Move-compatible games
Stadia games
Nintendo Switch games
Ubisoft games
Video games developed in France
Xbox One games
Xbox Series X and Series S games
Cancelled Wii games